KXY may refer to:

 Kyle XY, an American television drama series about a boy named Kyle, who has no memory of his life up until that point
 KXXY-FM, a radio station licensed to Oklahoma City, Oklahoma, United States